Jia Ziqi (born July 26, 2000) is a Chinese pair skater. With his skating partner, Wang Huidi, he is the 2020 Chinese junior national and 2022 Chinese national silver medalist and placed in the top nine at the 2020 World Junior Championships.

Personal life 
Jia was born on July 26, 2000 in Harbin, Heilongjiang. As of 2020, he is a high school student. Jia enjoys reading.

Career 
Jia began skating in 2008. His first pairs coach was Luan Bo. With his former skating partner, Zhang Yuyao, he competed in two Junior Grand Prix events.

Jia teamed up with Wang Huidi prior to the 2018–19 season. They finished fourth in the senior division at the 2019 Chinese Championships.

2019–2020 season 
Wang/Jia made their junior international debut at the 2019 JGP United States, placing fourth in both segments to finish fourth overall. They then competed at the 2020 Chinese Championships, where they narrowly lost the title by 0.01 points to Wang/Huang. At their next Junior Grand Prix event, 2019 JGP Croatia, they finished fifth.

Wang/Jia were named to the 2020 World Junior Championships team alongside Wang/Huang. Despite several mistakes in the free skating, including a fall on a throw triple flip and an underrotated double Axel in combination, Wang/Jia set personal bests for the free skating and total score to finish ninth overall.

2020–2021 season 
Due to the COVID-19 pandemic, the 2020–21 Junior Grand Prix, where Wang/Jia would have competed, was cancelled. Wang was age ineligible to participate in senior events, such as the Chinese Skating Association's semi-domestic Grand Prix event, the 2020 Cup of China.

2022–2023 season 
At the 2022 Chinese Championships, Wang/Jia won the silver medal behind Zhang/Yang. They placed ninth in the short program at the 2023 Four Continents Championships, but withdrew before the free skate.

Programs 
 With Wang

 With Zhang

Competitive highlights 
CS: Challenger Series; JGP: Junior Grand Prix

With Wang

With Zhang

Detailed results 
ISU Personal best in bold.

 With Wang

Senior results

Junior results

References

External links 
 
 

2000 births
Living people
Chinese male pair skaters
Figure skaters from Harbin